In mathematics, a form (i.e. a homogeneous polynomial) h(x) of degree 2m in the real n-dimensional vector x is sum of squares of forms (SOS) if and only if there exist forms  of degree m such that

Every form that is SOS is also a positive polynomial, and although the converse is not always true, Hilbert proved that for n = 2, 2m = 2 or n = 3 and 2m = 4 a form is SOS if and only if it is positive. The same is also valid for the analog problem on positive symmetric forms.

Although not every form can be represented as SOS, explicit sufficient conditions for a form to be SOS have been found. Moreover, every real nonnegative form can be approximated as closely as desired (in the -norm of its coefficient vector) by a sequence of forms  that are SOS.

Square matricial representation (SMR) 
To establish whether a form  is SOS amounts to solving a convex optimization problem. Indeed, any  can be written as

where  is a vector containing a base for the forms of degree m in x (such as all monomials of degree m in x), the prime ′ denotes the transpose, H is any symmetric matrix satisfying

The dimension of the vector  is given by

whereas the dimension of the vector  is given by

Then,  is SOS if and only if there exists a vector  such that

meaning that the matrix  is positive-semidefinite. This is a linear matrix inequality (LMI) feasibility test, which is a convex optimization problem. This representation is also known as Gram matrix.

Examples 

Consider the form of degree 4 in two variables . We have  Since there exists α such that , namely , it follows that h(x) is SOS.
Consider the form of degree 4 in three variables .

Generalizations

Matrix SOS 
A matrix form F(x) (i.e., a matrix whose entries are forms) of dimension r and degree 2m in the real n-dimensional vector x is SOS if and only if there exist matrix forms  of degree m such that

Matrix SMR 
To establish whether a matrix form F(x) is SOS amounts to solving a convex optimization problem. Indeed, similarly to the scalar case any F(x) can be written according to the SMR as

where  is the Kronecker product of matrices, H is any symmetric matrix satisfying

The dimension of the vector  is given by

Then,  is SOS if and only if there exists a vector  such that the following LMI holds:

Noncommutative polynomial SOS 

Consider the free algebra R⟨X⟩ generated by the n noncommuting letters X = (X1, ..., Xn) and equipped with the involution T, such that T fixes R and X1, ..., Xn and reverses words formed by X1, ..., Xn.
By analogy with the commutative case, the noncommutative symmetric polynomials f are the noncommutative polynomials of the form . When any real matrix of any dimension r × r is evaluated at a symmetric noncommutative polynomial f  results in a positive semi-definite matrix, f is said to be matrix-positive.

A noncommutative polynomial is SOS if there exists noncommutative polynomials  such that

Surprisingly, in the noncommutative scenario a noncommutative polynomial is SOS if and only if it is matrix-positive. Moreover, there exist algorithms available to decompose matrix-positive polynomials in sum of squares of noncommutative polynomials.

References

See also 
 Sum-of-squares optimization
 Positive polynomial
 Hilbert's seventeenth problem
 SOS-convexity

Homogeneous polynomials
Real algebraic geometry